Trioceros sternfeldi, the Crater Highlands side-striped chameleon or Tanzanian montane dwarf chameleon, is a species of chameleon found in Tanzania.

References

Trioceros
Reptiles described in 1963
Reptiles of Tanzania